The following is a list of films originally produced and/or distributed theatrically by Paramount Pictures and released between 1912 and 1919.

See also
 Paramount Pictures
 :Category:Lists of films by studio

References

External links
 Paramount Pictures Complete Library

 1910-1919
American films by studio
1910s in American cinema
Lists of 1910s films